Alexander Barbour (7 June 1862  –  29 December 1930) was a Scottish footballer, who played for Renton, Bolton Wanderers, Glossop North End, Nottingham Forest and the Scotland national team.

Barbour, who was born in Dumbarton and played as a striker, won the Scottish Cup with Renton in 1885. He won his first, and only, Scotland cap the same year, scoring in an 8–2 win over Ireland.  He also played in the unsuccessful Scottish Cup final the previous year as Renton lost 3–1 to Queen's Park.

He was signed by Bolton Wanderers in May 1888 and scored 17 goals in 34 matches in three years for the club. He had a season with Glossop North End in season 1891-92 and was then signed by Nottingham Forest as a coach, although he made one final league appearance for them in 1893.

References

External links

International stats at Londonhearts.com

1862 births
1930 deaths
Scottish footballers
Scotland international footballers
Bolton Wanderers F.C. players
Nottingham Forest F.C. players
Renton F.C. players
Sportspeople from Dumbarton
Footballers from West Dunbartonshire
Association football forwards
English Football League players
Glossop North End A.F.C. players
Place of death missing